Local elections were held in the province of Batangas on May 13, 2013 as part of the 2013 general election.  Voters will select candidates for all local positions: a town mayor, vice mayor and town councilors, as well as members of the Sangguniang Panlalawigan, the vice-governor, governor and representatives for the four districts of Batangas.

Provincial elections
The candidates for governor and vice governor with the highest number of votes wins the seat; they are voted separately, therefore, they may be of different parties when elected.

Gubernatorial election
Parties are as stated in their certificate of candidacies.

Vilma Santos Recto is the incumbent.

Vice-gubernatorial election
Parties are as stated in their certificate of candidacies.

Congressional elections 

Each of Batangas's four legislative districts will elect each representative to the House of Representatives.

1st District
Tomas Apacible is the incumbent. He will be facing off against Reynaldo Albajera, former representative Eileen Ermita-Buhain and Dr. Luisito L. Ruiz.

2nd District
Incumbent Hermilando Mandanas, who had earlier resigned from the Liberal Party is term limited. The Liberals nominated actor and incumbent board member Christopher de Leon, with the United Nationalist Alliance nominating former Board Member Godofredo Berberabe. Berberabe died on March 4, 2013; he was substituted by his brother, Danilo Berberabe.

3rd District
Sonny Collantes is the incumbent. He will be facing-off against former congresswoman Victoria Hernandez-Reyes, Tanauan City Mayor Sonia Aquino and Nicomedes Hernandez.

4th District
Mark L. Mendoza is the incumbent. He will be facing off against Bernadette Sabili, wife of Lipa City Mayor Meynardo Sabili (Liberal), running as independent

Sangguniang Panlalawigan elections
All 4 Districts of Batangas will elect Sangguniang Panlalawigan or provincial board members.

1st District
Municipality: Balayan, Calaca, Calatagan, Lemery, Lian, Nasugbu, Taal, Tuy
Population (2007):  522,607
Parties are as stated in their certificate of candidacies.

|-
|colspan=5 bgcolor=black|

|-

|-

2nd District
City: Batangas City
Municipality: Bauan, Lobo, Mabini, San Luis, San Pascual, Tuy
Population (2007):  558,882
Parties are as stated in their certificate of candidacies.

|-
|colspan=5 bgcolor=black|

|-

3rd District
City: Tanauan City
Municipality: Agoncillo, Alitagtag, Balete, Cuenca, Laurel, Malvar, Mataas na Kahoy, San Nicolas, Santa Teresita, Santo Tomas, Talisay
Population (2007):  537,399
Parties are as stated in their certificate of candidacies

|-

4th District
City: Lipa City
Municipality: Ibaan, Padre Garcia, Rosario, San Jose, San Juan, Taysan
Population (2007):  626,981
Parties are as stated in their certificate of candidacies

|-
|colspan=5 bgcolor=black|

|-

City and municipal elections
All municipalities of Batangas, Batangas City, Lipa City and Tanauan City will elect mayor and vice-mayor this election. The candidates for mayor and vice mayor with the highest number of votes wins the seat; they are voted separately, therefore, they may be of different parties when elected. Below is the list of mayoralty and vice-mayoralty candidates of each city and municipalities per district

1st District
Municipality: Balayan, Calaca, Calatagan, Lemery, Lian, Nasugbu, Taal, Tuy

Balayan
Incumbent Mayor Emmanuel Fronda is running for reelection and incumbent Vice Mayor Romel Castelo is not running for re-election.

Calaca
Incumbent Mayor Sofronio Ona, Jr. and vice mayor Larry Atienza are term limited. Atienza is running for mayor.

Calatagan
Incumbent Mayor Sophia Palacio is running for reelection. Incumbent Vice Mayor Lenie Pantoja is running for mayor. All women will be eyeing the mayoral seat.

Lemery
Incumbent mayor Eulalio Alilio is considered term limited because his first term started in 2006 after winning his electoral protest. Incumbent Vice Mayor Honorlito Solis is running for reelection.

Lian
Incumbent mayor Osita Vergara is term limited. Incumbent vice mayor Benito Magbago is running for reelection.

Nasugbu
Incumbent mayor Antonio Jose Barcelon is term limited. 

Incumbent vice mayor Apolo Villafania is term limited and is running for Mayor.

Taal
Incumbent mayor Michael Montenegro and vice mayor Fulgencio Mercado is running for reelection

Tuy
Incumbent Mayor Jose Jecerell Cerrado is running for reelection. Incumbent vice mayor Emmanuel Calingasan is not running

2nd District
City: Batangas City
Municipality: Bauan, Lobo, Mabini, San Luis, San Pascual, Tingloy

Batangas City
Incumbent Mayor Vilma Dimacuha is not running for reelection. His husband, Eduardo Dimacuha is running for Mayor.

Bauan

Lobo

Mabini

San Luis

San Pascual
Incumbent Mayor Antonio "Tony" Dimayuga is term-limited.

Tingloy

3rd District
City: Tanauan City
Municipality: Agoncillo, Alitagtag, Balete, Cuenca, Laurel, Malvar, Mataas na Kahoy, Batangas, San Nicolas, Santa Teresita, Santo Tomas, Talisay

Tanauan City

Agoncillo

Alitagtag

Balete

Cuenca

Laurel

Incumbent Mayor Randy James Amo is running for reelection. He will be facing off against former Mayor Natalio Panganiban, while vice mayor Florencio Villanueva is running for reelection.

Malvar

Mataas na Kahoy

San Nicolas

Santa Teresita

Santo Tomas

Talisay

4th District
City: Lipa City
Municipality: Ibaan, Padre Garcia, Rosario, San Jose, San Juan, Taysan

Lipa City

Ibaan

Padre Garcia

Rosario

San Jose

San Juan

Taysan

2013 Philippine local elections
Elections in Batangas
May 2013 events in the Philippines
2013 elections in Calabarzon